Below is a list of the men who have served in the capacity of Minister-President or equivalent office in the German state of Bavaria from the 17th century to the present.

Privy Council chancellor
Privy Council chancellors (Geheime Ratskanzler) were:

Ministers of Foreign Affairs 

Before 1849 Bavaria had no actual head of government, but the Minister of Foreign Affairs was the most senior of the ministers. In 1806, the office was given to the Minister of the Royal House and of Foreign Affairs.

Chairmen of the Council of Ministers
The office of Chairman of the Council of Ministers was established in 1849. With one exception (1880–1890), the Chairman was always the Foreign Minister.

Ministers-Presidents

Free State of Bavaria (1918–1945) 
 Minister-President of the Free State of Bavaria
Political party:

Free State of  Bavaria (1945–present) 
 Minister-President of Free State of Bavaria
Political party:

Timeline

See also
List of rulers of Bavaria

External links

 
Bavaria
Min
1650 establishments in the Holy Roman Empire